Wang Hui (1632–1717) was a Chinese landscape painter, one of the Four Wangs. He, and the three other Wangs, dominated orthodox art in China throughout the late Ming and early Qing periods. Of the Four Wangs, Wang Hui is considered the best-known today.

Beijing, Shanghai and Taipei museums loaned works for "Landscapes Clear and Radiant: The Art of Wang Hui (1632-1717)" in 2008 at the Metropolitan Museum of Art in New York.

Biography
Wang Hui followed in the footprints of his great grandfathers, grandfather, father and uncles and learned painting at a very early age.  He was later taught by two contemporary masters, Zhang Ke and Wang Shimin, who taught him to work in the tradition of copying famous Chinese paintings. This is most likely the reason why critics claim that his work is conservative and reflects the Yuan and Song traditions. One critic claimed that "his landscape paintings reflect his nostalgic attachment to classical Chinese aesthetics." Along with the other Wangs, Wang Hui helped to perpetuate the tradition of copying the ancient masters rather than creating original work.

Gallery

References

Further reading

External links
Wang Hui in the collection of the National Palace Museum, Taipei
Wang Hui in the collection of the Metropolitan Museum, New York

Qing dynasty landscape painters
1632 births
1717 deaths
Painters from Suzhou
People from Changshu